Pefki (meaning "pine", before 1959: Μαγκουφάνα - Magkoufana) is a suburb in the northeastern part of the Athens agglomeration, Greece. Since the 2011 local government reform it is part of the municipality Lykovrysi-Pefki, of which it is the seat and a municipal unit., it is part of North Athens regional unit. According to the 2021 population census, Pefki has 17,353 residents.

Geography

The municipal unit has an area of 2.176 km2. The built-up area of Pefki is continuous with those of the neighbouring suburbs Irakleio, Lykovrysi, Kifisia and Marousi. Pefki consists of two areas: Ano Pefki and Kato Pefki. Pefki is served by Athens Metro Line 1 and by several bus routes. The nearest motorway is Motorway 6, south of Pefki.

Historical population

Education

The Japanese Community School of Athens was previously located in Ano Pefki.

Twin towns
Pefki is twinned with:
 Cori, Lazio, Italy
 Krnov, Czech Republic
 Strovolos, Cyprus

Gallery

See also
List of municipalities of Attica

References

External links

City of Pefki official website 

Populated places in North Athens (regional unit)